Roger Hornsby McKee (September 16, 1926 – September 1, 2014) was a Major League Baseball pitcher who played from 1943 through 1944 for the Philadelphia Phillies. As a 16-year-old rookie in 1943, he was the youngest player to appear in a National League game that season. McKee was one of many ballplayers who appeared in the Major Leagues only during World War II. He made his major league debut on August 18, 1943, in a home doubleheader against the St. Louis Cardinals at Shibe Park. The best game of his short career, however, came on October 3, 1943, the last day of the season, when he started the second game of a doubleheader against the Pittsburgh Pirates at Forbes Field and pitched a complete game, winning 11–3. The losing pitcher was Cookie Cuccurullo, who was making his major league debut. Then, at 17, McKee became the youngest pitcher in the 20th century to throw a nine-inning complete-game victory on the final day of the regular season, a feat no one has accomplished since. McKee made his last pitching appearance for the Phillies on September 26, 1944. Overall, he posted a 1–0 record and a 5.87 earned run average in five games (one start), allowing 10 runs on 14 hits and six walks, while striking out one in 15 innings of work. He later switched to outfield and spent nine seasons in the minor Leagues spanning 1944–57, collecting a batting average of .287 and 115 home runs in 1,173 games. In 2014, McKee died in his hometown of Shelby, North Carolina, 15 days short before of his 88th birthday.

References

External links

1926 births
2014 deaths
People from Shelby, North Carolina
Baseball players from North Carolina
Baton Rouge Rebels players
Baton Rouge Red Sticks players
Charlotte Hornets (baseball) players
Columbus Red Birds players
Lynchburg Cardinals players
Major League Baseball pitchers
Newton-Conover Twins players
Philadelphia Phillies players
Rock Hill Chiefs players
St. Petersburg Saints players
Shelby Farmers players
Shreveport Sports players
Tampa Smokers players
Terre Haute Phillies players
Topeka Hawks players
Wilmington Blue Rocks players